Gareev or Gareyev (Tatar: Gərəyev, Гәрәев; Russian: Гареев) is a Tatar masculine patronymic surname derived from Tatar given name "Гәрәй" traditionally transliterated into English as Giray. Its feminine counterpart is Gareeva or Gareyeva.

It may refer to:
Aigul Gareeva (born 2001), Russian racing cyclist
Artyom Gareyev (born 1992), Russian ice hockey player
Makhmut Gareev (1923–2019),  Russian General of the Army, a historian, and a military scientist
Musa Gareyev (1922–1987), Bashkir Soviet ace, twice Hero of the Soviet Union
Timur Gareev (born 1988) is a chess Grandmaster from Uzbekistan

See also 
Garayev

Tatar-language surnames